The Apple Dumpling Gang is a 1971 novel by Jack Bickham, about a group of orphaned children during the California gold rush. They encounter a gambler who reluctantly helps them, as well as a pair of hapless robbers who are after the gold the children have found.

In 1975 Disney made a film based on the book.

The name of the gang refers to the American dessert.

References

1971 American novels
American children's novels
American historical novels
American novels adapted into films
California Gold Rush in fiction
Doubleday (publisher) books
Novels about orphans
Novels set in California
Western (genre) novels

simple:The Apple Dumpling Gang